Hope railway station was a rural railway station serving the small town of Hope in the Tasman district of New Zealand’s South Island. It was one of 25 stations on the Nelson Section, and existed from 1876 to 1955.

Facilities at this station included a small wooden passenger shelter, goods shed and siding.

History 

The first section of the Nelson Section to be built was from Stoke to Foxhill, as the route for this part of the line was the first to be confirmed while the route out of Nelson was still being debated. This included the construction of the Hope railway station, which was opened along with the first completed section from Nelson to Foxhill on 29 January 1876.

Hope was one of seven stations on the Nelson Section between Nelson and Belgrove to have a goods shed, and came to the attention of the Nelson Progress League in 1949 because of the condition of the goods shed. The League was, at the time, conducting a campaign to encourage government investment in the line, and cited Hope as an example of the dilapidated state of the railway. The goods shed was later demolished and replaced with a smaller lean-to structure.

In the 1950s, the Valetta Timber Company established a sawmill in a paddock behind the goods shed which included a private rail siding. This resulted in one of the busiest periods for revenue traffic for the station.

This station was closed for three days in June 1954 until the Nelson Section was granted a reprieve, and closed permanently on 3 September 1955.

Today 

The former Hope station yard is now part of the commercial premises of Taylor Timbers Ltd, a lumber wholesaler.

See also

 List of Nelson railway stations

References 

 

Defunct railway stations in New Zealand
Rail transport in Nelson, New Zealand
Railway stations opened in 1876
Railway stations closed in 1955
Buildings and structures in the Tasman District
Transport in the Tasman District